Grant Stuart Ledyard (born November 19, 1961) is a Canadian former professional ice hockey defenceman. Beginning his career in 1984 as an undrafted free agent,  Ledyard spent 18 seasons in the NHL as a journeyman; he played at least one game with nine NHL teams over the course of his career.

Playing career
As a youth, Ledyard played in the 1974 Quebec International Pee-Wee Hockey Tournament with a minor ice hockey team from Winnipeg.

Ledyard made his NHL debut in the 1984–85 season with the New York Rangers.  A journeyman, he played with nine NHL teams during his career.  He spent the most time with the Buffalo Sabres and the Dallas Stars, four full seasons each.  He also played for the Los Angeles Kings, Washington Capitals, Vancouver Canucks, Boston Bruins, Ottawa Senators, and Tampa Bay Lightning.  His last NHL season came with the Lightning in the 2001–02 season. 
In his NHL career, Ledyard appeared in 1,028 regular season games.  He scored 90 goals and added 276 assists.  In addition, he played in 83 Stanley Cup playoff games, scoring 6 goals and tallying 12 assists.

Personal life

Ledyard currently lives in the Buffalo area, and was recently awarded head coach position of the Buffalo Junior Sabres.

In 2016, Ledyard and 12 other ex-NHL players joined a class action lawsuit against the NHL for failing to protect its players against brain injuries.

Career statistics

Regular season and playoffs

International

Awards and achievements 
MJHL First Team All-Star (1982)
MJHL Top Defenceman (1982)
MJHL Most Valuable Player (1982)
Turnbull Cup MJHL Championship (1982)
1983-84 CHL Championship (Adams Cup) as a member of the Tulsa Oilers team coached by Tom Webster
Played in the World Championships for Team Canada (1985 and 1986)
Inducted into the Manitoba Sports Hall of Fame and Museum in 2005
"Honoured Member" of the Manitoba Hockey Hall of Fame

See also
List of NHL players with 1,000 games played

References

External links

Grant Ledyard’s biography at Manitoba Sports Hall of Fame and Museum
Grant Ledyard's biography at Manitoba Hockey Hall of Fame

1961 births
Living people
Boston Bruins players
Buffalo Sabres executives
Buffalo Sabres players
Canadian ice hockey defencemen
Dallas Stars players
Los Angeles Kings players
Fort Garry Blues players
New Haven Nighthawks players
New York Rangers players
Ottawa Senators players
Rochester Americans players
Saskatoon Blades players
Ice hockey people from Winnipeg
Tampa Bay Lightning players
Tulsa Oilers (1964–1984) players
Undrafted National Hockey League players
Vancouver Canucks players
Washington Capitals players
Canadian expatriate ice hockey players in the United States